The 1908 Drake Bulldogs football team was an American football team that represented Drake University in the Missouri Valley Conference (MVC) during the 1908 college football season. In its first season under head coach John L. Griffith, the team compiled a 6–2 record (1–2 against MVC opponents), finished in fifth place in the conference, and outscored all opponents by a total of 108 to 29.

The team played its home games at Haskins Field.

Schedule

References

Drake
Drake Bulldogs football seasons
Drake Bulldogs football